Irina Aleksandrovna Obedina (born July 1, 1985) is a Russian track and field athlete who specializes in the 400 metres hurdles. Her personal best in the 400 m hurdles is 54.86, achieved at Kazan on July 18, 2008. She also competes in the 400m and 600m although the hurdles is her main field.

She is competing in the 400 metres hurdles at the 2008 Beijing Olympics where qualified for the second round with the ninth fastest overall time of 55.71 seconds.

External links

sports-reference

1985 births
Living people
Russian female hurdlers
Athletes (track and field) at the 2008 Summer Olympics
Olympic athletes of Russia